Bertens is a surname. Notable people with the surname include:

Christel Bertens (born 1983), Dutch bobsledder and track and field athlete
Huub Bertens (born 1960), Dutch bridge player
Kiki Bertens (born 1991), Dutch tennis player

See also
Bertāns
Mertens